The Matrix Theatre Company is a theatre company located in Los Angeles, California.

The Matrix was opened in 1977 by producer Joseph Stern.

In 2018 it hosted The Guy Who Didn't Like Musicals by Starkid Productions.

Awards and nominations

References

External links

Theatres in Los Angeles
Theatres completed in 1977